The 2001 European Road Championships were held in Apremont, France, between 24 August and 26 August 2001, regulated by the European Cycling Union. The event consisted of a road race and a time trial for men and women under-23.

Schedule

Individual time trial 
Friday 24 August 2001
 Women under-23
 Men under-23

Road race
Sunday 26 August 2001
 Women under-23
 Men under-23

Events summary

Medal table

References

External links
The European Cycling Union

European Road Championships, 2001
Road cycling
European Road Championships by year
International cycle races hosted by France